Qutab (Tat: gitob) is an Azerbaijani dish made from thinly rolled dough that is cooked briefly on a convex griddle known as a saj.

Composition
When the weather gets warmer, the number of dishes made from wild plants increases. Qutab belongs to Azerbaijani cuisine and later on, it was popular in other South Caucasian cuisines as well, considered to be an Karabagh dish despite its clear Azerbaijani origin. Qutab is made by creating a stiff dough from flour, water, eggs, and salt. The dough is rolled into a thin circular layer and the middle of each circle filled with stuffing before finally being folded into a crescent shape. The resulting patties are griddled on both sides and served by pouring over butter on top. Qutab is usually served with yoghurt with green coriander, fennel and sumac.

Variations
There are many variations of qutab: usually, pumpkin and greens are used as fillings. There are also Shamakhy qutab, Yashyl Qutab and Qarın qutabı, quzu qutabı (lamb), deve qutabi specific for Jorat settlement. They are regional variations of qutab in Azerbaijan.

See also 

 Chiburekki
 Gözleme
 Haliva
 Qottab

References

Azerbaijani cuisine
Azerbaijani inventions
Azerbaijani words and phrases
Savoury pies
Flatbread dishes
National dishes